David Samuel Zucker (born October 16, 1947) is an American film director, producer, and screenwriter. Associated mostly with parody comedies, Zucker is recognized as the director and writer of the critically successful 1980 film Airplane! as well as being the creator of The Naked Gun franchise and for directing Scary Movie 3 and Scary Movie 4.

Career
Zucker's movies include The Kentucky Fried Movie in 1977, Ruthless People in 1986, The Naked Gun in 1988, The Naked Gun 2½: The Smell of Fear in 1991, BASEketball in 1998, Scary Movie 3 in 2003, and its sequel Scary Movie 4 in 2006.  Out of 18 works he is associated with, Phone Booth, which he produced in 2002, is the only non-comedic film.

He co-directed several films including Airplane! in 1980 and Top Secret! in 1984; along with his brother, Jerry, and Jim Abrahams, the trio make up the ZAZ team of directors. He has also worked with Pat Proft (with whom he first teamed up on the Naked Gun show Police Squad!) and Craig Mazin (writer of three of the five Scary Movies). In 1987, both David and Jerry Zucker through Zucker Brothers Productions had inked an agreement with Paramount Pictures for a two-year non-exclusive production agreement and development deal with the studio, and the brothers had anticipated cranking out four comedies for Paramount Pictures during the life of the pact, and the first film was a feature film version of the early 1980s television show Police Squad!, which was originally cancelled after six episodes on the air.

ZAZ and Proft helped develop the parody genre of films, in which jokes are spit out with rapid-fire, using puns, physical humor, wit, and double entendres. Some of the veteran actors of ZAZ's vision of parody include Leslie Nielsen, Lloyd Bridges, Charlie Sheen, Julie Hagerty, and Anna Faris (Faris starred in four of the Scary Movie series).

Looking back on his career in 2009, Leslie Nielsen said the best film he appeared in was The Naked Gun, and that Zucker was his favorite director to work with. Nielsen said of him, "He came to me one time and said, 'Leslie, I'll never make you do anything that is not funny.' And he kept his word." Most consider his greatest work to be Airplane!, which has brought on many accolades (including preservation in the National Film Registry by the Library of Congress).

In his movies, his mother, Charlotte was often cast in a small bit part (like the lady trying to put on make-up in Airplane!, one of the Lucille Ball impersonators in Rat Race, and Vincent Ludwig's secretary, Dominique, in The Naked Gun: From the Files of Police Squad!).

Zucker is an aficionado of Davy Crockett and collects memorabilia, and has stated that his dream project is to make a biographical film, which he has spent time developing. During the 1990s he regularly hosted a Davy Crockett Rifle Frolic at his ranch in Ojai, California. Zucker wrote 11 updated verses to the song "The Ballad of Davy Crockett", which he claimed in 1992 that he had worked harder on those than on any of his scripts. Zucker made a cameo appearance in The Naked Gun 2½ dressed as Crockett.

Zucker began to focus more on politics starting in 2004 when he began working on political ads for the Republican Party. In 2008, he made the political parody movie An American Carol.  In 2015, he made a video he called Side Effects attacking President Barack Obama for the Iran nuclear deal in the form of a parody prescription drug ad.
In 2017, Zucker said that he was working on a script for a fourth Naked Gun film with Pat Proft. In 2018 he made a cameo appearance on the hidden camera TV series Impractical Jokers, where he was on FaceTime with cast member James Murray for a sketch to make the other person laugh.

In 2021, Zucker announced his return to filmmaking with a new spoof film titled The Star of Malta.

Personal life 
Zucker was born to a Jewish family in Milwaukee, Wisconsin, the son of Charlotte Zucker and  Burton C. Zucker, who was a real estate  developer. He graduated from Shorewood High School. In 1997, Zucker married Dr. Danielle Zucker, with whom he has two children, Charles and Sarah. He and Danielle were divorced in 2019, though they had been separated for ten years before that. His younger brother, Jerry, is his filmmaking partner. The Zucker brothers have a sister, Susan Breslau. When asked in a September 2014 interview by the BBC if he believes in God, Zucker replied:

Environmentalism 
Zucker has been an active supporter of TreePeople since 1988 and is now the longest continuously serving board member (1990) in the organization's history.

Zucker has been an advocate of solar-powered and electric cars since the '90s. "I can't complain about the smog in Los Angeles if I'm contributing to it," Zucker said to the Sun Sentinel in 1990.

Recurring cast members
Among all of his directed and/or produced parody films, Zucker had frequently cast the late Leslie Nielsen.

Filmography

Films 

As producer
 A Walk in the Clouds (1995)
 Phone Booth (2002)
 The Onion Movie (2008)
 Superhero Movie (2008)

As executive producer
 Brain Donors (1992)
 "For Goodness Sake II" (1996) (short film)

Acting roles

Television

TV series

Other work

Acting roles

Songwriter 

 "Spend This Night With Me" (performed by Val Kilmer in Top Secret!, 1984)
 "I Guess I'm Just Screwed" (performed by Colleen Fitzpatrick in The Naked Gun 2½: The Smell of Fear, 1991)
 "It's Your Birthday" (performed by more actors in High School High, 1996)

References

External links

David Zucker at Discogs
GreenCine interview
Jewish Journal interview
Weekly Standard interview

1947 births
Film directors from Wisconsin
California Republicans
Living people
Filmmakers from Milwaukee
Writers Guild of America Award winners
Jewish American screenwriters
Wisconsin Republicans
University of Wisconsin–Madison alumni
Screenwriters from Wisconsin
American parodists
Comedy film directors
Parody film directors
Shorewood High School (Wisconsin) alumni
21st-century American Jews